Salmon Falls is a former settlement in El Dorado County, California. It was flooded by Folsom Lake. Nearby were waterfalls from which the place got its name. The site is now registered as California Historical Landmark #571.

Overview
Mining began at Salmon Falls in 1848, and the town was founded in 1850. Laying out of the town began at Higgins Point in 1853.  The post office arrived in 1851, and remained in operation until 1912, with closures during parts of 1875 and 1893.  The population peaked at 3003 during the gold years.

Salmon Falls, California was an old mining town established along the banks of the American River at the mouth of Sweetwater Creek (northeast of present-day Folsom, California).  Since the construction of Folsom Dam in the 1950s (which created Folsom Lake) Salmon Falls is typically immersed in water throughout much of the year.  However, at low-water levels old foundations, roads, and the old Salmon Falls Bridge are easily accessible.

Remains from the local cemetery were exhumed and relocated along with remains from other town sites that were inundated by Folsom Lake after Folsom Dam was built (see Mormon Island).

References

External links
 Salmon Falls Local History

Former settlements in El Dorado County, California
Populated places established in 1850
1850 establishments in California
Ghost towns in California
Destroyed towns
Submerged settlements in the United States
California Historical Landmarks
1848 establishments in California